Dobra is an unincorporated community in Logan County on West Virginia Route 17, West Virginia, United States. Their post office has been closed.

References 

Unincorporated communities in West Virginia
Unincorporated communities in Logan County, West Virginia